Somanniathelphusa pax is a species of crab that belongs to the family Gecarcinucidae. The species was first identified in 1995 in Vietnam.

References

Gecarcinucidae
Crustaceans described in 1995
Arthropods of Vietnam